Burka or burqa may refer to :

 Burka (surname)

Garments 
 Burqa, a full body cloak worn by some Muslim women
 Burka (Caucasus) a traditional man's coat made from felt or karakul
 Kobeniak, Ukrainian traditional garment

Places 
 Burqa, Ramallah, a village on the West Bank
 Burqa, Nablus, a village on the West Bank
 Burka District, in Baghlan province, Afghanistan
 Barqa, Gaza, Palestinian village, depopulated in 1948

See also 
 Birka (disambiguation)
 Burca (disambiguation)
 Barca (disambiguation)